Harry Clements may refer to:

 Harry R. Clements (born 1929), American engineer and businessman
 Harry Clements (footballer) (1883–1939), English footballer